The 1991 Brabantse Pijl was the 31st edition of the Brabantse Pijl cycle race and was held on 31 March 1991. The race started in Sint-Genesius-Rode and finished in Alsemberg. The race was won by Edwig Van Hooydonck.

General classification

References

1991
Brabantse Pijl
Brabantse Pijl
Brabantse Pijl